Pudob is a village south of Stari Trg pri Ložu in the Municipality of Loška Dolina in the Inner Carniola region of Slovenia.

Church

The local church in the settlement is dedicated to Saint James and belongs to the Parish of Stari Trg. It was built in the first half of the 16th century.

References

External links

Pudob on Geopedia

Populated places in the Municipality of Loška Dolina